Martin Ash was a British performer, percussionist, artist and art lecturer better known to many by his stage name Sam Spoons, the percussionist of The Bonzo Dog Doo Dah Band.

Early life and education 
He was born in Bridgwater but moved to Barnstaple when he was 12. He was the first student to gain an A-Level in art at Barnstaple Grammar School, before moving to Plymouth to study illustration (NDD Honours). From 1963 to 1966 he studied industrial design at the Royal College of Art.

Career

Musician
He joined The Bonzo Dog Doo Dah Band in 1963 leaving in 1968 and rejoining in 2006. Ash was also a member of Bob Kerr's Whoopee Band recording with the band on their eponymous LP.

Credited as Sam Spoons, Martin appeared on all the early Bonzo Dog Doo Dah Band singles and highly popular debut album Gorilla (1967). He was co writer and arranger of Jazz, Delicious Hot, Disgusting Cold which formed part of the Guest House Paradiso (1999) film soundtrack.

In 2006 Martin Ash and other surviving members of The Bonzo Dog Doo Dah Band reunited - along with Stephen Fry, Ade Edmondson and Phill Jupitus - for a reunion tour.

Artist and lecturer
Martin worked as a senior art lecturer at Chelsea School of Art from 1972 until retirement.

A posthumous solo art exhibition, which Ash had been working on, was presented by White Moose gallery at Tapeley Park in Instow, from 14 October to 16 October 2018, titled KerbArt : A Solo Exhibition by Martin Ash (AKA Sam Spoons).

Death 
Ash died on 27 September 2018 following a five year battle with cancer, aged 76. His funeral was held, at North Devon Crematorium in Barnstaple, on 16 October, with collections for North Devon Hospice and Over and Above.

References 

British percussionists
British artists
Alumni of the Royal College of Art
1940s births
Year of birth uncertain
2018 deaths
People from Bridgwater